Jeppe Theis Tverskov (born 12 March 1993) is a Danish professional footballer who plays as a centre back for Danish Superliga club OB.

Football career

B 1903
Born in Copenhagen, Tverskov started playing football at the age of three at Boldklubben 1903 (B 1903). As a 17-year-old, he was promoted to the first senior team competing in the fourth-tier Denmark Series by the then manager Bent Christensen. In his first season, he made 24 appearances and seven goals, and was voted Player of the Year at the club.

Lyngby
In June 2011, Tverskov moved to Lyngby Boldklub on the recommendation of his manager, Bent Christensen. At that club, he played alongside fellow youngsters such as Yussuf Poulsen, Christian Nørgaard and Uffe Bech. In June 2012, he was promoted to the first-team by head coach Niels Frederiksen. Tverskov made his first professional appearance on 4 November 2012 against Hobro IK in the second-tier Danish 1st Division. He came on as a 90th-minute substitute for David Boysen, as his team won 2–1. He scored his first professional goal on 25 April 2014, during a 0–3 league victory for his team over Hvidovre IF.

Randers
On 30 June 2014, Tverskov joined Randers, where he signed a two-year contract. He played his first match for the club on 23 September in a Danish Cup match against Kolding Boldklub. He started the match as a defensive midfielder and stood out by also scoring his first goal for Randers, thereby participating in his team's 1–7 win. The club finished fourth in the Danish Superliga at the end of the 2014–15 season and managed to qualify for the qualifying rounds of the UEFA Europa League. Tverskov played his first European match in this competition, on 2 July 2015 against Andorran club UE Sant Julià. He appeared as a starter, but was however sent off after receiving a second yellow card, as Randers won 1–0.

OB
As his contract expired with Randers, Tverskov signed with Odense Boldklub (OB) in the summer of 2016, the transfer being announced on 20 April of the same year. He made his first appearance for the club on the first matchday of the 2016–17 Superligaen season, against SIlkeborg. That day, he started the match, which ended in a 0–0 draw.

References

1993 births
Living people
Footballers from Copenhagen
Danish men's footballers
Boldklubben 1903 players
Lyngby Boldklub players
Randers FC players
Odense Boldklub players
Denmark Series players
Danish 1st Division players
Danish Superliga players
Association football defenders